Hell Chose Me is the third studio album by American deathcore band Carnifex, released February 16, 2010, through Victory Records.

Background
The band started writing and recording the album Hell Chose Me in 2009. Upon its release, the album received positive reception and acclaim for its musical styling, structure, and concepts. Carnifex maintained that this was due to having more time during the writing and recording process than their previous albums.

On January 5, the band uploaded the first single from Hell Chose Me. They began streaming the entire album to the public on February 10, 2010.

On May 28, 2010, the band embarked on a European Tour with supporting acts Veil of Maya and Suffokate beginning in Bochum, Germany and ending on June 19, 2010, at the Summerblast Festival in Trier, Germany.  The tour included shows in Spain, France, UK, the Netherlands, Sweden, Slovakia, Hungary, Austria, Italy and Switzerland. The tour was presented by Avocado Booking.

Track listing

Personnel
Carnifex
 Scott Lewis – vocals
 Ryan Gudmunds – lead guitar
 Cory Arford – rhythm guitar
 Fred Calderon – bass
 Shawn Cameron – drums

Production
 Carnifex – producer
 Zack Ohren – producer, engineer, tracking, mixing, mastering
 Alan Douches – mastering at West West Side Music
 Brent Elliott White – artwork, cover design

Charts

References

Carnifex (band) albums
2010 albums
Victory Records albums